The 2015–16 Lafayette Leopards women's basketball team represented Bucknell University during the 2015–16 NCAA Division I women's basketball season. The Bison, led by fifth year head coach Aaron Roussell, played their home games at Sojka Pavilion and were members of the Patriot League. They finished the season 25–8, 17–1 in Patriot League play to share the Patriot League regular season title with Army. They advanced to the semifinals of the Patriot League women's tournament where they lost to Loyola (MD). As champs of the Patriot League who failed to win their conference tournament, they received an automatic bid to the Women's National Invitation Tournament they defeated Akron in the first round before losing to Michigan in the second round.

Roster

Schedule

|-
!colspan=9 style="background:#FF5E17; color:#0041C4;"| Non-conference regular season

|-
!colspan=9 style="background:#FF5E17; color:#0041C4;"| Patriot League regular season

|-
!colspan=9 style="background:#FF5E17; color:#0041C4;"| Patriot League Women's Tournament

|-
!colspan=9 style="background:#FF5E17; color:#0041C4;"| WNIT

See also
 2015–16 Bucknell Bison men's basketball team

References

Bucknell
Bucknell Bison women's basketball seasons
Bucknell
Bucknell